Bacteriastrum delicatulum is a diatom in the genus Bacteriastrum.

References

Coscinodiscophyceae